Südbahn (German for Southern Railway) may refer to:
 Austrian Southern Railway, a former railway company in the Austrian Empire and Austria-Hungary
 Southern Railway (Austria), a railway line in Austria, initially operated by Austrian Southern Railway
 Southern Railway (Württemberg), a railway line in Germany

See also 
 Southern Railway (disambiguation)